So You Think You Can Dance is a United States television reality program and dance competition airing on the Fox Broadcasting Company network. Season four premiered on May 22, 2008, with Nigel Lythgoe and Mary Murphy returning as permanent judges and Cat Deeley returning to host. Joshua Allen was announced as the winner on August 7, 2008, the first hip-hop dancer to win the title.

Auditions
Open auditions for this season were expanded to the following six cities:

For the first time, New York City was not a stop on the audition tour.
To be able to audition, contestants had to be between the ages of 18 and 30 and able to be legally employed in the United States. Partner auditions were allowed.

Las Vegas week

Over 200 contestants who impressed the judges in the initial auditions each received a plane ticket to a challenging week of callback auditions at the Planet Hollywood Resort and Casino in Las Vegas, Nevada. The week consisted of multiple rounds of choreography, with dancers cut from the competition every round. This season, the rounds included a hip-hop routine with Napoleon D'umo and Tabitha D'umo, a Broadway number with Tyce Diorio, the foxtrot with Jean-Marc Généreux, group choreography, contemporary choreography with Mia Michaels, and a final solo for the remaining contestants. Nigel Lythgoe and Mary Murphy were part of the judging panel for the week, along with Debbie Allen, Mia Michaels, Napoleon D'umo and Tabitha D'umo.

Finals

Format
As in seasons 2 and 3, the finals began with 20 contestants, ten male and ten female. After partners are assigned, couples pick a dance style out of a hat, are rehearsed by a choreographer, and perform their routine. Following the airing of the performances, home viewers vote for their favorite couple. The bottom three couples (six dancers overall) are then liable for elimination by the judges on the live, or broadcast on Broadcast delay in the western United States, results show. All six dancers perform a solo, after which the judges eliminate one male and one female contestant. If the eliminated dancers are not from the same couple, their respective partners form a new pair for the following week's performances. Once the field of dancers is narrowed down to the top 10, permanent partnerships dissolve and contestants draw their new partners from a hat each week. The judges no longer have any say in the elimination process; viewers call in to vote for their favorite individual dancer, and the male and female with the lowest number of votes are eliminated each week.

Because of the inclusion of performer William Wingfield into the top 20 dancers, Debbie Allen was ruled ineligible to perform duties as a Guest Judge during the Finals phase, as long as Wingfield remained in the competition. Wingfield is a Contemporary dancer from Nashville, Tennessee who trained under Allen at the Debbie Allen Dance Academy. He was voted off the competition on July 24, 2008. Because of Wingfield being eliminated, Debbie Allen was technically able to guest judge for the top six episode, but Adam Shankman was the guest judge instead.

Top 20 Contestants

Female Contestants

Male Contestants

Elimination chart
The song played for the females and males varied throughout the season. Every week, a different song was played.
Contestants are in alphabetical order by last name, then in reverse chronological order of elimination.

Jessica King suffered an injury that resulted in her being unable to continue in the competition. She was medically withdrawn, and Comfort Fedoke replaced her as she was the most recent female competitor eliminated.
Katee Shean was awarded $50,000 for being America's favorite female dancer.

Performances

Week 1 (June 11, 2008)
Judges: Nigel Lythgoe, Mary Murphy, Dan Karaty
Couple dances:

Week 2 (June 18, 2008)
Judges: Nigel Lythgoe, Mary Murphy, Mia Michaels
Couple dances:

Week 3 (June 25, 2008)
Judges: Nigel Lythgoe, Mary Murphy, Adam Shankman
Couple dances:

Week 4 (July 2, 2008)
Judges: Nigel Lythgoe, Mary Murphy, Tabitha and Napoleon D'umo
Couple dances:

Week 5 (July 9, 2008)
Judges: Nigel Lythgoe, Mary Murphy, Mia Michaels
Couple dances:

* Comfort Fedoke and Thayne Jasperson were eliminated by the judges, but Jessica King later had to withdraw from the competition due to injury. She was replaced by Fedoke, the most recent eliminated female.

Week 6 (July 16, 2008)
Judges: Nigel Lythgoe, Mary Murphy, Lil' C
Couple dances:

Solos:

Week 7 (July 23, 2008)
Judges: Nigel Lythgoe, Mary Murphy, Toni Basil
Couple dances:

Solos:

Week 8 (July 30, 2008)
Judges: Nigel Lythgoe, Mary Murphy, Adam Shankman
Couple dances:

Solos:

Week 9 (August 6, 2008)
Judges: Nigel Lythgoe, Mary Murphy, Mandy Moore
Group dance: Top 4: "Hallelujah"—The Vitamin String Quartet (Contemporary; Choreographer: Mia Michaels)
Mia Michaels
Couple dances:

Solos:

Results shows

Week 1 (June 12, 2008)
Group dance: Top 20 and Nigel Lythgoe: "Cobrastyle"—Robyn (Pop-jazz; Choreographer: Wade Robson)
Guest dancer(s): Popin' Pete and Shonn Boog: "I Can Make You Dance" – Zapp (Popping)
Musical guest: "When I Grow Up" – Pussycat Dolls
Solos:

Eliminated
Rayven Armijo: "It's Only Life"—Kate Voegele
Jamie Bayard: "Best Days (Here Comes the Rest of Our Lives)"—Graham Colton
New partners:
None

Week 2 (June 19, 2008)
Group dance: Top 18: "Elevator"—Flo Rida feat. Timbaland (Hip-Hop; Choreographer: Shane Sparks)
Guest dancer(s): Timo Nuñez (auditioned for season 1 and season 2, making it to Las Vegas week both times)
Musical guest: "In the Ayer"—Flo Rida featuring will.i.am
Solos:

Eliminated:
Susie Garcia: "Brave"—Idina Menzel
Marquis Cunningham: "Wonderful World"—James Morrison
New partners:
None

Week 3 (June 26, 2008)
Group dance: Top 16: "The Dance"—Charlotte Martin (Contemporary; Choreographer: Mia Michaels)
Guest dancer(s): Quest Crew: "Chemical Calisthenics"—Blackalicious feat. Cut Chemist (Breakdance)
Musical guest: "One Step at a Time"—Jordin Sparks
Solos:

Eliminated:
Chelsea Traille: "When You're Gone"—Avril Lavigne
Chris Jarosz: "All We Are"—OneRepublic
New partners:
Comfort Fedoke and Thayne Jasperson

Week 4 (July 3, 2008)
Group dance: Top 14: "Money Money" from Cabaret (Broadway; Choreographer: Tyce Diorio)
Guest dancer(s): Robert Muraine: "Gonna Make You Sweat"—C+C Music Factory (Popping)
Musical guest: "Say (All I Need)"—OneRepublic
Solos:

Eliminated:
Kourtni Lind: "Incredible"—Clique Girlz
Matt Dorame: "Might As Well Have a Good Time"—Crosby, Stills, & Nash
New partners
None

Week 5 (July 10, 2008)
Group dance: Top 12: "Closer"—Ne-Yo (Hip-Hop; Choreographers: Tabitha and Napoleon D'umo)
Guest dancer(s): Alvin Ailey American Dance Theater "Revelations": "Sinner Man"—Billy Porter (Modern ballet)
Musical guest: "I Kissed a Girl"—Katy Perry
Solos:

Eliminated:
Comfort Fedoke: "The Greatest"—Michelle Williams
Thayne Jasperson: "Believe"—Staind
New partners:
None. Now that only the top ten remain, new partners are randomly assigned each week, and they'll be voted individually.
* It was reported on July 14, 2008, that Jessica King was injured and as a result could not continue in the competition. Comfort Fedoke returned to the show in place of King.

Week 6 (July 17, 2008)
Group dances:

Solos:

Eliminated:
 Kherington Payne: "Forever May You Run"—Gavin Rossdale
 Gev Manoukian: "It Ends Tonight"—The All-American Rejects

Week 7 (July 24, 2008)
Group dance: Top 8: "Universal Mind Control"—Common (Hip-Hop; Choreographer: Chuck Maldonado)
Guest dancer(s): Los Angeles Ballet Pas de deux: "The Man I Love" from Who Cares?
Musical guest: "Baby"—LL Cool J featuring The-Dream
Solos:

Eliminated:
 Comfort Fedoke: "Come Home"—OneRepublic
 William Wingfield: "Love Remains the Same"—Gavin Rossdale

Week 8 (July 31, 2008)
Group dance: Top 6: "The Rose"—Bette Midler (Contemporary; Choreographer: Mandy Moore)
Guest dancer(s): Lil' Demon: "Planet Rock"—Afrika Bambaataa & The Soul Sonic Force (Breakdance)
Musical guest: "Just Dance"—Lady Gaga
Solos:

Eliminated:
 Chelsie Hightower: "Come Home"—OneRepublic
 Mark Kanemura: "All I Can See"—Brendan James

Week 9 (Grand Finale) (August 7, 2008)
Judges: Nigel Lythgoe, Mary Murphy, Debbie Allen, Lil' C, Adam Shankman, Mia Michaels
Group dances:

Guest dancers:

Musical guest: "Burnin' Up"—Jonas Brothers

 All of the top 20 but Jessica King performed. King, who was still injured, was not featured in the group opening.
 Muraine and Chbeeb both auditioned earlier in the season. Chbeeb contracted pneumonia and was medically advised to withdraw and Muraine later quit during the Las Vegas auditions. Chbeeb was later selected to the Top 20 for Season 5.
 Dmitry Chaplin, Ryan Conferido, Anya Garnis, Jaimie Goodwin, Allison Holker, Lauren Gottlieb, Neil Haskell, Hok Konishi, Ivan Koumaev, Melody Lacayanga, Dominic Sandoval, Benji Schwimmer and Travis Wall

Judges' picks

4th Place
Courtney Galiano: "It's Only Life"—Kate Voegele
3rd Place
Katee Shean: "From Where You Are"—Lifehouse (She won $50,000 for being the top female dancer.)
Runner-Up:
Stephen "tWitch" Boss
Winner
 Joshua Allen

Awards

2009 Emmy Awards

† Tyce Diorio, along with Rob Ashford from 81st Academy Awards were joint-winners.

Broadcast outside of US 
It is broadcast on the Canadian channels, CTV and MuchMusic, and also on Fox Life in Poland. It is also broadcast on TVNorge in Norway and Nelonen in Finland!  It is also broadcast on Channel 10 in Australia and on AXN in India.

Ratings

U.S. Nielsen ratings

See also 
 List of So You Think You Can Dance finalists

References

External links 
 Official "So You Think You Can Dance" Website
 

2008 American television seasons
Season 04